The Order of the Republic is a state decoration of Sudan established on 16 November 1961 and given to Sudanese and foreigners who rendered outstanding contributions to the government. The order is the highest Sudanese honour. The order has two issues: the Governor General issu﻿﻿e w﻿ith the Rhinoceros suspension, and the Democratic Republic of Sudan's issue with the emblem of the Republic (Secretarybird) suspension.

It is not permissible to repeat awarding of decorations and medals, or to rise from one class to a higher one, except after the lapse of at least three years from the date of awarding them. This period is reduced to one year for employees if they are referred to retirement. Orders and medals remain the property of the awardee, and their heirs as a souvenir without any of them having the right to carry it. Without prejudice to any other punishment stipulated in the laws of Sudan, it is permissible, by order of the President of the Republic, to strip the bearer of a necklace, sash, medal, medallion, cloak of honour, or belt if they commit an act that is dishonourable or inconsistent with loyalty to the state.

Classes

Class I 
It consists of a silk ribbon of corrugated violet colour, divided longitudinally by seven light green stripes, and ends with a medal consisting of three tandem surfaces, the first of which is white enamel with the inscription (Democratic Republic of Sudan) in dark blue and surrounded by the colours of the flag of the Democratic Republic of Sudan and the two surfaces The second and third are made of platinum metal, in addition to yellow enamel motifs at the edges of the second surface. The medal hangs from a golden circle in the middle, which is a drawing of the emblem of the Democratic Republic of Sudan circling the scarf from right to left. The sash is followed by a large medal (medallion) carried on the chest on the left side.

Class II 
It consists of a necklace made of silk cloth, the same colour as the scarf. It is worn around the neck, and a medallion similar to the medallion of Class I hangs from it, followed by a (medallion) worn on the chest on the left side, similar to the medallion of the scarf.

Class III 
It consists of a necklace of silk fabric similar to the necklace of the second class, worn around the neck, and a medal similar to the medal of the second class hanging from it.

Class IV 
It consists of a medal worn on the chest on the left side. The medal hangs from a golden circle in the middle, which is a drawing of the emblem of the Democratic Republic of Sudan (Secretarybird). This circle is attached to an undulating silk ribbon of the same colour as the ribbon of the Third Class Medal. Class IV consists of only two surfaces, the first of which is white enamel with the inscription (Democratic Republic of Sudan) in dark blue and surrounded by the colours of the flag of the Democratic Republic of Sudan. The second is made of platinum metal, the edges of which are decorated with small circles of yellow enamel.

Class V 
It consists of a medal worn on the chest from the left side. The medal hangs from a golden circle in the middle which is a drawing of the emblem of the Democratic Republic of Sudan (Secretarybird). This circle is clasped on a wavy silk ribbon of the same colour as the ribbon of Class IV. The decoration consists of two synonymous surfaces only, the first of the white enamel on which is written (the Democratic Republic of Sudan) in dark blue and surrounded by the colours of the flag of the Democratic Republic of Sudan, and the second of platinum metal. It differs from the Order of the Fourth Class in that its edges are not decorated with circles of yellow enamel.

Notable recipients 

 1970 Haile Selassie
 1975 Andrew W. Riang Wieu
 1979 Ismail al-Haj Mousa
 1993 El-Nazeer Dafalla
 2013 Ahmad bin Abdullah Al Mahmoud
 2013 
 2014 Sadiq al-Mahdi
 2014 Mohammed Uthman al-Mirghani al-Khatim
 2017 Zhang Gaoli
 2018 Riek Machar
 2021 Chris Coons
 Amin Abusineina
 Peter Gatkuoth Gual
 Izzeddin Hamid
 Kamil Mohamad Said
 Mohamad Sayid al-Shaar
 Ahmad Abdulhaum
 Omer Yousif Birido
 Sayed Abdallahi El Hassan

References 

Orders, decorations, and medals of Sudan
Awards established in 1961